Eduardo Morera (9 January 1906 – 21 January 1997) was an Argentine film director. Although his career was relatively short compared to other directors of the period, he directed 18 films between 1930 and 1943, including influential tango films such as 1937's Así es el tango. He worked with popular actors of the period such as Tita Merello and Tito Lusiardo.

Filmography

Añoranzas (1930) 
Canchero (1930) 
El Carretero (1930) 
Enfundá la mandolina (1930) 
Mano a mano (1930) 
Padrino Pelado (1930) 
Rosas de Otoño (1930) 
Tengo miedo (1930) 
Viejo smoking (1930) 
Yira, yira (1930)
Diez canciones de Gardel (1931)
Idolos de la radio (1934)
Por buen camino (1935)
Ya tiene comisario el pueblo (1936) 
Así es el tango (1937) 
Un Bebé de contrabando (1940) 
Melodies of America (1941)
Rosas de otoño (1943)

External links

Argentine film directors
People from Buenos Aires
Tango film directors
1906 births
1997 deaths